The Candidate is a 1998 Taiwanese political satire mockumentary film directed and written by Neil Peng, starring himself as presidential candidate Hsu Giu Jing who campaigns for national vegetarianism. The film was shown at the 1999 Hawaii International Film Festival.

Cast
Neil Peng as Hsu Giu Jing
Yu Mei-jen as Yu Mei-jen, Hsu Giu Jing's wife
Lang Tsu-yun as Irene, Hsu Giu Jing's spokesperson
Emi Lee as Yu An-an
Debby Yang as Annie
Chao Tzu-chiang as Vice President Li
Shih Wei as Vice President Feng
Lu Wei-lin as Male news reporter
Yang Yu-wen as Female news reporter
Huang Chih-hao as Wei
Chin Andi as Mao
Lan Ling as Zhen
Chen Yaling as Mei
Chien Te-men as Master Hsing Hsing
Alyssa Chia as Hsu Giu Jing's mother
Sun Da-wei as Hsu Chiu Jing's father
Wang Yu-wen as Hsu Giu Jing's father's lover
Wang Hao-wei as Chiang Kai-shek's physician

Special appearances

Cheng Tsai-tung as Cheng Tsai-tung, painter
Yee Chin-yen as Documentary director
Sisy Chen as "Herself", Hsu Giu Jing's secret lover
Chen Horng-chi as himself
Cheng Li-wen as herself
Pang Chien-kuo as himself
Jaw Shaw-kong as himself
Kevin Tsai as himself
Poe Ta-chung as himself
Susan Yeh as herself
Ellen Huang as herself
Winston Chao
Danny Dun as man interviewed on the street
Chien Wei-chuan as Basketball player
Ang Lee as Hsu Giu Jing's childhood friend

References

External links

Films shot in Taiwan
Political satire films
1990s mockumentary films
1990s political films
1990s satirical films
Films set in Taiwan
1990s Mandarin-language films
Taiwanese comedy films
Political mockumentaries
Vegetarianism in fiction